The term aggravated felony was used in the United States immigration law to refer to a broad category of criminal offenses that carry certain severe consequences for aliens seeking asylum, legal permanent resident status, citizenship, or avoidance of deportation proceedings. Anyone convicted of an aggravated felony and removed from the United States "must remain outside of the United States for twenty consecutive years from the deportation date before he or she is eligible to re-enter the United States." The supreme court ruled 5-4 in Sessions v. Dimaya that the residual clause was unconstitutionally vague limiting the term. 

When the category of "aggravated felonies" was first added to the Immigration and Nationality Act in 1988, as a response to heightened concerns about drug abuse, it encompassed only murder and trafficking in drugs or firearms. The Antiterrorism and Effective Death Penalty Act of 1996 (AEDPA) and the Illegal Immigration Reform and Immigrant Responsibility Act of 1996 (IIRIRA) both tremendously expanded the category. AEDPA added crimes related to gambling and passport fraud; IIRIRA added a great many more crimes, including certain crimes of a sentence of at least a year regardless of whether the sentence had been suspended.

List of aggravated felonies
The following chart lists all past aggravated felonies (as of 2018, not updated with information from Sessions v. Dimaya):

Controversial issues involving an aggravated felony
The definition of aggravated felony has significantly expanded since its inception in 1988. A series of amendments have expanded its reach to the point that an aggravated felony need not be aggravated, nor a felony, to trigger the consequences of such a conviction. In United States of America v. Winston C. Graham, 169 F.3d 787 (3rd Cir. 1999), the Third Circuit Court of Appeals held that the respondent's 1990 petit larceny, a Class A misdemeanor with a maximum of one year imprisonment under New York law, constitutes an aggravated felony. 

In Lopez v. Gonzales, 549 U.S. 47 (2006), the Supreme Court ruled that because immigration law is under the control of the federal government, the definitions of any terms on the aggravated felony list comes from federal law, not state law. This holding calls into question the result in Graham because under federal law a crime must be punishable by imprisonment for a term "exceeding" one year in order to be considered an aggravated felony, otherwise it is cruel and unusual punishment under the Eighth Amendment to the United States Constitution. 'In (a)(20), Congress explains that the term "crime punishable by imprisonment for a term exceeding one year does not include ... any State offense classified by the laws of the State as a misdemeanor and punishable by a term of imprisonment of two years or less."

In Leocal v. Ashcroft, the Court ruled that driving under the influence is not an aggravated felony if the DUI statute that defines the offense does not contain a mens rea element or otherwise allows a conviction for merely negligent conduct.

In Popal v. Gonzales, 416 F.3d 249, 254 (3d Cir. 2005), the Third Circuit Court of Appeals held that Pennsylvania simple assault does not constitute crime of violence under 18 USC § 16(a) and is therefore not an aggravate felony.

In Sessions v. Dimaya, The Supreme Court struck down the "residual clause", which classified every felony that, "by its nature, involves a substantial risk" of "physical force against the person or property" as an aggravated felony 

Consequences of an aggravated felony conviction
An alien convicted of an aggravated felony may not:
 enter the United States without being pardoned or paroled by the government
 have removal orders cancelled without specific authorization of the Attorney General
 receive asylum in the United States, although he or she may possibly qualify for the United Nations Convention against Torture (CAT) but depending on the case and situation of his or hers country of origin 
 become a citizen of the United States

At the same time, any alien convicted of an aggravated felony is automatically subject to expedited removal intended to ensure that the deportation occurs as soon as the alien is released from prison after serving the sentence imposed for the underlying crime.  These deportation orders are not subject to review by the federal courts, although federal courts have ruled that they may determine which crime constitutes an aggravated felony.

IIRIRA required that any alien convicted of an aggravated felony must be detained while awaiting removal, resulting in the detention of far more aliens than before the Act took effect. In Demore v. Kim, the Court ruled that the mandatory detention provision of IIRIRA was constitutional.

Consequences of illegal re-entry after deportation
A related use of the term "aggravated felony" comes in the context of the definition of the crime of illegal reentry into the United States following deportation, and the corresponding sentencing enhancement provided by the Federal Sentencing Guidelines. It is a crime for an alien to illegally enter or without be found without permission in the United States after that alien has been deported. The maximum sentence for this crime is 2 years; however, if that deportation follows a conviction for an aggravated felony, the maximum sentence increases to 20 years.

Furthermore, the guideline that corresponds to this crime typically doubles or triples the sentence the alien would otherwise have received if the deportation follows conviction for an aggravated felony. In Almendarez-Torres v. United States, the Supreme Court held that this increased maximum sentence did not violate the Sixth Amendment.

Comparison to crimes involving moral turpitude (CIMT)
The consequences of making a crime an aggravated felony are far reaching. One major consequence is that, unlike the deportability ground for a crime involving moral turpitude (CIMT), aggravated felonies do not have to be committed within five years after admission into the U.S. to give rise to deportability. (E.g. a Lawful Permanent Resident who was admitted into the U.S. as a small child and who commits an aggravated felony at age 60 becomes deportable).

Some aggravated felonies make a person deportable without regard to the actual or potential sentence attached to the conviction. For details, see list of aggravated felonies'' in the chart at the top.

Sources
 Immigration Law and Procedure, 5th ed., by David Weissbrodt and Laura Danielson

References

External links 
When Misdemeanors are Felonies: The Aggravated Felony of Sexual Abuse of a Minor, by William J. Johnson, vol. 52, 2007/08.
Aggravated Felonies by Public Officials in North Carolina

United States immigration law
Criminal law
American legal terminology